is a Japanese professional darts player who plays in Professional Darts Corporation (PDC) events.

Career

BDO
Asada won the Japan Open in 2012 by beating Osamu Niki in the final. He won the tournament for the second time in 2014, beating Katsuya Aiba in the final. Asada reached the last 16 of the 2014 World Masters in Hull and beat Darryl Fitton in the first round before losing to Mark McGeeney. He qualified for the 2015 BDO World Darts Championship, losing to Brian Dawson in the preliminary round. Asada qualified for the 2016 BDO World Darts Championship, beating Darius Labanauskas 3–1 in the preliminary round.

PDC
In 2017, Asada won the Japanese Championship, organised by the PDJ (Professional Darts Japan). Thereby, he qualified for the 2018 PDC World Championship. 
On 26 November, he was drawn for a preliminary round game at the World Championship against Australian Gordon Mathers, whom he defeated 2–1, but was then eliminated 0–3 by eventual tournament winner Rob Cross.

In 2018, Asada won three events on the inaugural PDC Asian Tour, and also won the Japanese Championship to qualify for the 2019 PDC World Darts Championship.

World Championship results

BDO
 2015: Preliminary round (lost to Brian Dawson 1–3)
 2016: First round (lost to Wesley Harms 2–3)
 2017: Preliminary round (lost to Jeff Smith 1–3)

PDC
 2018: First round (lost to Rob Cross 0–3)
 2019: Second round (lost to James Wade 2–3)
 2020: Third round (lost to Peter Wright 2–4)

Performance timeline
BDO

PDC

External links
 Seigo Asada's profile and stats on Darts Database

References

1980 births
Living people
Sportspeople from Osaka
Japanese darts players
British Darts Organisation players
PDC World Cup of Darts Japanese team
Professional Darts Corporation associate players